Germán Martínez may refer to:

 Germán Martínez (Mexican politician) (born 1967), Mexican politician
 Germán Martínez (Argentine politician) (born 1975), Argentine politician
 Germán Martínez (swimmer) (born 1979), Colombian swimmer
 Germán Martínez Hidalgo (1929–2009), Mexican scientist